The 2015 Boys' EuroHockey Youth Championships was the 7th edition of the Boys' EuroHockey Youth Championships. It was held from 22 to 28 July 2013 in Vienna, Austria at HC Wien.

Belgium were the defending champions. Austria and Scotland were promoted from the Youth Championship II.

Qualified teams

Format
The eight teams will be split into two groups of four teams. The top two teams advance to the semifinals to determine the winner in a knockout system. The bottom two teams play in a new group with the teams they did not play against in the group stage. The last two teams will be relegated to the Youth Championship II.

Results
''All times are local (UTC+2).

Preliminary round

Pool A

Pool B

Classification round

Fifth to eighth place classification

Pool C

First to fourth place classification

Semi-finals

Third and fourth place

Final

Statistics

Final standings

References

External links
European Hockey Federation
Official website

Youth Championships
EuroHockey Youth Championships
EuroHockey Youth Championships
International field hockey competitions hosted by Austria
EuroHockey Youth Championships Boys
EuroHockey Youth Championship